Ordway is an unincorporated community in Brown County, in the U.S. state of South Dakota.

History
Ordway was platted in 1880. The community was named for Nehemiah G. Ordway, seventh Governor of Dakota Territory, from June 1, 1880 until June 24, 1884. A post office was established in Ordway in 1881, and remained in operation until it was discontinued in 1944.

References

Unincorporated communities in Brown County, South Dakota
Unincorporated communities in South Dakota